Stentorian is a heavy metal band from Bangladesh formed in early 2001. Stentorian released one commercially successful album, Protimuhurtey, in 2005 and several commercially successful singles. Their most popular songs include "Adrissho Juddho", "Bishonno Adhaar", "Bidrohi", "Jolosrot", "Anubhuti", "Mone pore na" and most recently "Chhobi". Stentorian is regarded as one of the pioneers of the underground heavy metal music movement, which re-energized heavy metal in Bangladesh in this current decade. Perhaps Stentorian is most notable for being led by two of the greatest Bangladeshi rock vocalists of all time Torsha Khan and Tanim Sufyani" and for their commercially successful single Bishonno Adhaar where they featured Sumon from Aurthohin.

Stentorian is typically classified as heavy metal, but it ranges from soft rock, power ballad to thrash metal and most recently progressive metal. Their appreciation of early rock and heavy metal is reflected in some of their occasional cover songs. Stentorian's heavy metal lyrics typically cover such topics as war, good versus evil, abuse of power, psychological depression, social disorder and politics.

History

2001–2003: Early years
Stentorian's first line-up had Torsha Khan (vocals), James Kabir (guitar), Shams Alim Biswas (bass), Golam (guitar), and Bobby Khan (drum). After 10 months of hard practice and patience, Stentorian got their first ever break at a concert in the Indian High Commission Auditorium, Dhaka (27 October 2001). From the very first show, Stentorian had instant appeal. Torsha's vocal performance was widely praised among both critics and fellow musicians. Around 2003, Golam left the band, going abroad for higher studies. However, the band continued performing shows and writing songs.

2003–2004: Adrissho Juddho

Stentorian's first big break was an invitation to participate in Aguntuk-2, a band mixed album coordinated by Bassbaba Sumon. Unfortunately, they had to sacrifice Torsha because at that time he had to leave Bangladesh to pursue higher studies (later immigration). Members somehow managed to record the vocal tracks for Adrissho Juddho & Bhoy with Torsha. Both the songs were later released that year respectively in the mixed albums Aguntuk-2 and Dinbodol. Adrissho Juddho instantly became both a commercial and critical success across the nation (later, a cult classic).

2004–2006: Bishonno Adhaar & Protimuhurtey

In 2004, when Stentorian's fate was at stake, and members were thinking about breaking up and forming own projects, Torsha, who was still with the band, suggested his childhood friend Tanim Sufyani join. Tanim Sufyani joined Stentorian in September 2004. Tutul Rashid and Rafiul Habib also joined at this time.

The band performed in over 100 concerts in 2005 alone. During this era, Stentorian was often referred to as "The most popular band of underground" in numerous places, including internet forums, newspaper, magazines, etc. Stentorian finally achieved mainstream success when Bishonno Adhaar was released, which featured Bassbaba Sumon from Aurthohin (Bishonno Adhaar is the first ever featured song in Bangladesh). Bishonno Adhaar became an instant success all over the nation and Stentorian got their second classic. Stentorian received almost 100% positive reviews from the leading musicians and legends of Bangladesh. James gained cult following with the song, and he were fondly nicknamed "Rocket Roll V" and "Riff Master" by his fans. With the huge success of Bishonno Adhaar, Stentorian did their first ever national tour. After the tour, they signed up with G-Series, a major musical label of Bangladesh. Stentorian concentrated on recording of their debut album.

Torsha came back to Bangladesh for just a month in August 2005. Stentorian took advantage of his presence and quickly recorded six songs with Torsha. However, Torsha could not perform any concerts due to the shortage of time. After his departure, Stentorian fully concentrated on the album and in October 2005 Stentorian's debut album Protimuhurtey was released. Protimuhurtey catapulted the band to prominence, with sales that were "way above five figures" copies nationwide (considered Gold). Songs like Jolosrot, Mone Pore na and Onubhuti became people's favorite, and they are often sung by the younger generation.

2007 – present: comeback, 2nd album and future

After one year of irregular activity and the ultimate departure of Torsha and Shams from the band, Stentorian restarted its journey once again with a track on the mixed album Rock 101, Choritrohin. Anabeel Sen replaced Shams on Bass. Choritrohin gained much critical attention as the song narrates secret desires of a perverted rapist. Stentorian announced that they are releasing second album soon enough. Stentorian started national tour once again and started to appear at media regularly. On 7 March 2010, a song was released from the second album as an album preview, "Chhobi". The song was also made available for free download. "Chhobi" was downloaded more than 45000 times from its original hosting only. Stentorian's 4 June 2010 live show at ABC Radio was attended by thousands of fans around Dhaka city. Till date Stentorian is working on their 2nd album and so far 8 songs have been recorded. In December 2011, Tanim Sufyani left Stentorian again due to some personal problems, forming the short-lived band Pledge Karma. In January 2012, "Rabiul Awal Real" joined as Tanim's replacement, and in March 2013 Sumit Gaurab joined the family replacing Tutul Rashid. Ahmad Abdullah Saquib recently joined the band in 2015, replacing Rafiul Habib on drums.

Discography

Studio albums
 2005: Protimuhurtey
 2011: Untitled second album (Announced)

Compilation tracks

 2004: Adrissho Juddho (Agontuk-2)
 2004: Bhoy (Dinbodol) 
 2005: Nilkal (Lokayot)
 2005: Bishonno Adhaar (feat. Bassbaba) (Agontuk-3)
 2007: Opomrittu (UnderGround-2)
 2008: Choritrohin (Rock 101)

Popularity 
Stentorian along with Rockstrata, Warfaze, Aurthohin, Artcell, Black, Cryptic Fate, Metal Maze, Arbovirus, Nemesis, Vibe, and Kronic are among the first and few bands in Bangladesh to popularize Heavy Metal and Hard Rock in the country.

Band members 
 James Kabir – Guitars, Backup Vocals (2001–present)
 Anabeel Sen – Bass, Backup Vocals (2008–present)
 Rabiul Awal Real – Vocals (2012–present)
 Sumit Gaurab – Guitars (2013–present)
 Ahmad Abdullah Saquib – Drums and Percussion (2015–present)

Former members 
 Golam Waise – Guitars (2001–2003)
 Bobby Khan – Drums (2001–2003)
 Torsha Khan – Vocals (2001–2008)
 Shams Alim Biswas – Bass, Backup Vocals (2001–2007)
 Tanim Sufyani – Vocals (2004–2011)
 Tutul Rashid – Guitars (2003–2012)
 Rafiul Habib – Drums and Percussion (2003–2015)

References

External links

Media coverage
CONCERT AT RUSSIAN CULTURAL CENTRE
Heavy metal concert held at Russian Cultural Center

Musical groups established in 2001
Bangladeshi heavy metal musical groups
Thrash metal musical groups